Jacob Banks (born 1991) is a British singer-songwriter.

Jacob Banks may also refer to:

 Jacob Banks (The Bill), fictional character in the British television series The Bill
 Jacob Banks Kurtz (1867–1960), Republican member of the U.S. House of Representatives from Pennsylvania
 Sir Jacob Bancks (1662–1724), also Banks, Swedish naval officer in the British service and Tory Member of Parliament
 Jacob Banks (MP for Shaftesbury) (1704–1738), British politician